Lucky Dog is a 1933 American drama film directed by Zion Myers and written by Zion Myers and Roland Asher. The film stars Charles "Chic" Sale, Tom O'Brien, Harry Holman and Clarence Geldart. The film was released on April 20, 1933, by Universal Pictures.

Plot

Cast 
Charles "Chic" Sale as Arthur Wilson
Tom O'Brien as The Detective
Harry Holman as The Business Man
Clarence Geldart as Drunk #1

References

External links 
 

1933 films
American drama films
1933 drama films
Universal Pictures films
American black-and-white films
1930s English-language films
1930s American films